Alexandr Levintsov (born 2 March 1981) is a Ukrainian pair skater who also competed for Poland. He competed for Ukraine with Ekaterina Kovtunenko and Ekaterina Lebedeva, and for Poland with Dominika Piątkowska.

He was coached by Valentina Galinska and Mirosława and Włodzimierz Brajczewski.

Career highlights
(with Piątkowska)

(with Ekaterina Lebedeva)

External links
 

1981 births
Polish male pair skaters
Ukrainian male pair skaters
Living people
Sportspeople from Odesa